Tlibisho is a rural locality (a selo) and the administrative centre of Tlibishinsky Selsoviet, Akhvakhsky District, Republic of Dagestan, Russia. The population was 941 as of 2010.

Geography 
Tlibisho is located on the Akhvakh River, 12 km southwest of Karata (the district's administrative centre) by road. Tlisi is the nearest rural locality.

References 

Rural localities in Akhvakhsky District